

List

References

J